Peter A. Lillback is an American theologian who is President and Professor of Historical Theology and Church History at Westminster Theological Seminary, a Presbyterian and Reformed Christian graduate educational institution in Glenside, Pennsylvania. He also serves as the president of the Providence Forum and a senior editor at Unio cum Christo: An International Journal of Reformed Theology and Life. Lillback has been ordained in the Orthodox Presbyterian Church (OPC), and holds credentials as teaching elder in the Presbyterian Church in America (PCA).
Lillback held degrees from Cedarville University (B.A.), Dallas Theological Seminary (Th.M.), and Westminster Theological Seminary (Ph.D.). He is the author of the biography George Washington’s Sacred Fire, based on primary-source research and scholarship on the life of George Washington.

References

Westminster Theological Seminary faculty
Reformed Episcopal Seminary faculty
American Calvinist and Reformed theologians
20th-century Calvinist and Reformed theologians
21st-century Calvinist and Reformed theologians
Presidents of Calvinist and Reformed seminaries
Orthodox Presbyterian Church ministers
Living people
Cedarville University alumni
Dallas Theological Seminary alumni
Westminster Theological Seminary alumni
1952 births